Leshem (Hebrew: לֶשֶם) is a religious Israeli unauthorized settlement in the West Bank. It is located on Route 446, about 13 km (8 miles) west of the Palestinian city of Salfit and about 37 km (23 miles) northwest of Jerusalem, in the Palestinian side of the Israeli West Bank barrier. Leshem is neighbored by the Israeli settlements of Alei Zahav (of which Leshem is officially "a neighborhood"), Peduel, Bruchin, Beit Aryeh-Ofarim, the archeological site of Deir Samaan, and the Palestinian villages Rafat, Kafr ad-Dik, and Deir Ballut.

Leshem settlement rises to a height of 360 meters (1181.1 feet) above sea level and is stretched across two hills, the eastern hill and the western hill which altogether cover about 497 dunam (122.811 acres).

The international community considers Israeli settlements in the West Bank illegal under international law, but the Israeli government dispute this.

History 
In 1999, Lubavitcher Chassidim expressed their interest in putting down roots in what is known today as the western hill of Leshem, and shortly after building permits had been acquired, construction of a new settlement started. The settlement was named Adanim.

In 2020, Leshem was one of several Israeli settlement which dumped its untreated sewage onto  Deir Ballut land.

References

External links
 Leshem Official Website
 Leshem Official Facebook Page

American-Jewish culture in Israel
Argentine-Jewish culture in Israel
Australian-Jewish culture in Israel
British-Jewish culture in Israel
Canadian-Jewish culture in Israel
French-Jewish culture in Israel
Dutch-Jewish culture in Israel
Community settlements
Populated places established in 2013
Religious Israeli settlements
Russian-Jewish culture in Israel
South African-Jewish culture in Israel
Israeli settlements in the West Bank
Israeli outposts
Unauthorized Israeli settlements